Päraküla may refer to several places in Estonia:

Päraküla, Pärnu County, village in Tõstamaa Parish, Pärnu County
Päraküla, Viljandi County, village in Suure-Jaani Parish, Viljandi County